The PRB 408 is a Belgian square shaped anti-tank mine.

The mine consists of a polyethylene case with a handle in one side and a cylinder in the top of the box.  It contains a high explosive charge, a pressure-initiated fuse, a pressure plate and seven fuse wells but no power source. The mine is detonated when the pressure plate collapses by the action of a vehicle.

There is a variant, the PRB M3409, which has waterproof capabilities can be placed in shallow waters, it is probably the predecessor to the PRB M3 antitank mine.

References 
The Journal of Conventional Weapons Destruction

See also 
ORDATA

Anti-tank mines
Land mines of Belgium